Electric Zoo is an annual electronic music festival held over Labor Day weekend in New York City on Randall's Island. The festival represents all genres of electronic music, bringing top international DJs and live acts from multiple countries to four stages.

In its 2009 inaugural year, 26,000 people attended to see artists Armin van Buuren, Deadmau5, David Guetta and Ferry Corsten. In 2011, Electric Zoo expanded to a 3-day festival and with 85,000 attendees. Electric Zoo received International Dance Music Awards nominations in 2010, 2011, 2012, and 2013 for "Best Music Event".

History

Electric Zoo 2009
Electric Zoo 2009 was held during Labor Day weekend on September 5, 6, 2009. It featured 55 artists over the course of the 2 days the event spanned.

Electric Zoo 2010
Electric Zoo 2010 was held on Labor Day weekend on September 4, 5, 2010. There were 66 acts during the 2 day festival.

Electric Zoo 2011
Electric Zoo added one more day to the event from previous years, leading to the event being 3 days (Friday/Saturday/Sunday) instead of 2, which led to the performances of over 100 artists (expanding from the 66 of the previous year). The dates of the event were September 2, 3, 4, 2011. The overall attendance for all three days was 85,000.

Electric Zoo 2012
Electric Zoo 2012 was the largest festival yet as over 110,000 people attended over the three days (8/31/12 - 9/2/12) with sold out crowds on Saturday and Sunday. The event was headlined by Above & Beyond, Pretty Lights, David Guetta, Laidback Luke, Dada Life, Tiësto, Porter Robinson and Skrillex.  Made Event offered free water refill stations, designated help points and employed security staff.

Electric Zoo 2013

Deaths and cancellation 
The final day of Electric Zoo 2013 on September 1, 2013 was cancelled after two attendees, Jeffery Russ and Olivia Rotondo, died from hyperthermia and an overdose of MDMA during the festival, and four others had fallen ill. The organizers of the event and a number of performers provided their condolences to the victims. In response to concerns that the incident could affect future music events in the city, Mayor Michael Bloomberg's press secretary Marc LaVorgna stated that while the city would investigate the incident, live music events "have been part of the fabric of New York City for decades." On September 3, 2013, Bloomberg made a statement on the matter, lauding organizers for being "nothing but cooperative" in the wake of the tragedy.

Electric Zoo 2014
In response to the incidents that occurred at the 2013 edition, festival organizers worked with the New York City Department of Parks and Recreation to conduct a review of Electric Zoo's health and safety practices. A stronger security and medical presence was present at Electric Zoo 2014, with a particular focus on preventing illegal drugs from being brought into the festival grounds, and providing additional medical services to attendees. All attendees were required to watch a two-minute-long, anti-drug public service announcement to activate their wristbands before they entered the festival. Additionally, to minimize sun exposure, the festival's daily start time was pushed forward to 1:00 p.m. ET from 11:00 a.m. ET.

The festival was cancelled part-way through its final day, this time due to severe thunderstorms hitting New York City and the United States northeast.

Electric Zoo 2015 
In December 2014, it was announced that ID&T, organizers of the Tomorrowland festival and a fellow SFX subsidiary, would serve as a "creative partner" for Electric Zoo 2015. The festival was revamped with an "immersive" zoo-themed atmosphere patterned off ID&T's other franchises, featuring new animal-themed stage designs. The revamp was headed by ID&T creative director Jeroen Jansen, who assisted in launching ID&T's other festival brands in the United States. The partnership came as part of an effort to re-launch the festival in the aftermath of the 2013 deaths; steps were also taken to address comments and complaints received via a survey after the 2014 edition, such as entry times and the number of washrooms available. Alesso, Above & Beyond, and The Chemical Brothers were announced on May 1, 2015 as the first headliners of the festival, with the remainder of the festival's lineup revealed throughout the month.

The concert was held over the Labor Day weekend, September 4, 5, 6, 2015.

Electric Zoo 2016 
Electric Zoo 2016 took place for its eighth year at Randall's Island during Labor Day weekend, 2–4 September 2016. Billboard worked with the event to announce the headliners for the 2016 festival, which included Tiesto, Hardwell, and Bassnectar. Other artists began getting announced on 28 April 2016 via Electric Zoo's social media pages. Stages for the 2016 festival were curated by Anjunadeep, ANTS, Buygore, Dim Mak, Elrow, and Sunday School.

Electric Zoo 2018
Electric Zoo 2018 was held during Labor Day weekend on August 31–September 2. It was called "The Big 10," in honor of the festival's 10th anniversary.

Electric Zoo 2019 
Electric Zoo 2019 was held during Labor Day weekend on August 30–September 1.

Electric Zoo 2021 
The event was cancelled in 2020 due to the COVID-19 pandemic. The event returned in 2021, with safety protocols including all stages being open-air,, and requiring proof of vaccination in order to attend. The stages featured a new theme, "Supernaturals", including "The Den" (house and techno), "The Gateway" (melodic trance and melodic bass), "The Teleporter", and the main stage "The Hive". The festival was nearly hampered by rains from Hurricane Ida.

Electric Zoo 2022

Electric Zoo 2022 was held during Labor Day weekend on September 2–September 4.

Electric Zoo Mexico
On December 15, 2013, Made Event announced the first edition of Electric Zoo outside the United States. Electric Zoo Mexico took place May 3 and 4, 2014 in Mexico City.

Initiatives

In 2010, Made Event donated $42,000 to FLOW, an outdoor art exhibition project in coordination with The Randall's Island Park Alliance, The Bronx Museum of the Arts, and Rockefeller NYC Cultural Innovation Fund. The organizers of Electric Zoo also donated $2 from every ticket sale in 2011 to the project. In 2011, Electric Zoo also partnered with Music Unites, a 501(c)3 non-profit organization, to auction off a Pioneer CDJ-2000 signed by Electric Zoo artists, and helped bring music education to underprivileged children in innercity school systems.

In 2011, Electric Zoo introduced an on-site recycling program for all trash, water in cardboard containers, compostable plates and utensils, began using 100% biodiesel alternative fuel from NYC fryer grease, and required that all food vendors source only organic, hormone-free, humanely raised animals.

Awards and nominations

DJ Magazine's top 50 Festivals

International Dance Music Awards

Pre-2016

2018–present

See also
 
List of electronic music festivals

Notes

References

External links
 
 About Electric Zoo Festival on russian

Music festivals established in 2009
Electronic music festivals in the United States
Electronic music festivals in Mexico
Festivals in Mexico City
Music festivals in New York City